CECXG (3'-ethyl-LY-341,495) is a research drug which acts as a potent and selective antagonist for the group II metabotropic glutamate receptors (mGluR2/3), with reasonable selectivity for mGluR3. While it is some five times less potent than LY-341,495 at mGluR3, it has 38x higher affinity for mGluR3 over mGluR2, making it one of the few ligands available that is able to distinguish between these two closely related receptor subtypes.

References

Eli Lilly and Company brands
Xanthenes
MGlu2 receptor antagonists
MGlu3 receptor antagonists